Flavihalobacter is a Gram-negative, aerobic, rod-shaped and non-motile genus of bacteria from the family of Flavobacteriaceae with one known species (Flavihalobacter algicola). Flavihalobacter algicola has been isolated from the alga Saccharina japonica from Weihai.

References

Flavobacteria
Bacteria genera
Monotypic bacteria genera
Taxa described in 2021